General elections were held in Gibraltar on 26 January 1984. The Association for the Advancement of Civil Rights (AACR) administration of Joshua Hassan was re-elected for a further term.

The election was referred to as the "dockyard election", as the future of the Gibraltar Royal Naval Dockyard was the only significant campaign issue.

Background
Under the constitution of 1969, in the 1980s the Gibraltar House of Assembly had seventeen seats, two held by official members appointed by the Governor of Gibraltar (the attorney-general and the financial secretary), and fifteen others elected at-large by the whole electorate in a single Gibraltar-wide constituency. A party or coalition winning eight seats in the Assembly had an effective majority and formed the government.

The Association for the Advancement of Civil Rights (called in full the "Gibraltar Labour Party Association for the Advancement of Civil Rights") had been the dominant political force in Gibraltar since the Second World War, winning every election but one. Hassan had been Chief Minister since 1964, apart from the three years between 1969 and 1972, and the previous election, held on 6 February 1980, had produced a House of Assembly with eight AACR members, six from the opposition Democratic Party for a British Gibraltar, and one other, Joe Bossano, leader of the Gibraltar Socialist Labour Party. Despite his party's five other candidates all losing, Bossano had had a personal triumph, polling only sixty-four fewer votes than Hassan.

Campaign
The election was called "the dockyard election", as almost the only campaign issue was the British Government's plans, agreed with Hassan's AACR government, to transfer the Gibraltar Royal Naval dockyard to Appledore International, with new investment from Britain of £ 28 million, but with a loss of some four hundred jobs. In the circumstances, the election amounted to a referendum on these proposals. Hassan and his AACR campaigned in favour of the deal, on the slogan "the only way ahead". Hassan stated firmly "I have obtained a very fair package and I feel a duty to see it implemented over the next four years. No one could have obtained a better deal." However, both of the leading opposition parties, the Democratic Party for a British Gibraltar led by Peter Isola and the Socialist Labour Party of Joe Bossano, campaigned against. The Democrats' platform was that on winning the election they would renegotiate the deal and press Britain for a further £5 million to pay for economic diversification. The leader of the Socialist Labour Party, Bossano, was also a leading member of the Transport and General Workers Union, the biggest labour organization in Gibraltar, and his position was that Appledore should be sent packing and the British government's £28 million should be spent "to relaunch Gibraltar's economy on a sounder and more durable foundation".

Results
The turnout on 26 January 1984 was 74%, one of the highest ever known for a Gibraltar election. Despite the re-election of Hassan's AACR administration, all eight of its candidates being elected to the House of Assembly, there was a dramatic turn of events in the politics of Gibraltar, with Isola's Democratic Party, the main opposition to the AACR since 1980, losing all six of its seats, and Bossano's Socialist Labour Party winning seven and taking over as the official opposition. Bossano himself came third in the at-large election, beating six of the winning party's candidates. In a touch of irony, his party's only losing candidate was surnamed "Victory".

By candidate
The first fifteen candidates were elected to the House of Assembly.

References

General elections in Gibraltar
Gibraltar
General
Gibraltar
Election and referendum articles with incomplete results